Jakob Schubert (born December 31, 1990) is an Austrian professional rock climber, sport climber and boulderer. He was World Champion (2012, 2018, 2021) and World Cup winner (2011, 2014, 2018) in Lead climbing. In August 2021, he won bronze at the 2020 Summer Olympics in Tokyo. As of the end of 2022, Shubert had won the most men's IFSC gold medals of any competitive climber in history.

Biography 
He started climbing in 2003, when he was twelve years old. In 2004, he participated in the European Youth Cup and World Youth Championships. Since 2007, he regularly participates in the World Cup competitions for lead climbing. For seven world Cup seasons out of ten, from 2007 to 2016, he also competed in bouldering.

In 2011, he won the Lead World Cup and the silver medal at the Lead World Championships in Arco. The World Cup was outstandingly obtained by winning seven consecutive competitions in that season. Previously, no climber was ever able to win as many World Cup competitions in a single season (in 2002, Alexandre Chabot had won six).

In 2012, he won the Lead Climbing World Championships in Paris.

In 2014, he won the Lead World Cup for the second time.

In 2018, when he was 27 years old, he became World Champion again, in his own birthplace and home town, Innsbruck. He earned the title by reaching in the final event the same score as Adam Ondra (36+), but a higher score in the semifinal, where he ranked second after Domen Škofic. A few days later, in the same competition, he also conquered the Combined title by ranking second in Speed, first in Bouldering and second in Lead. In the same year, he was awarded his third World Cup.

Schubert's performance at the 2019 IFSC Climbing World Championships qualified him for a place at the Tokyo 2020 Olympics where he won Bronze.

Rankings

Climbing World Cup

Climbing World Championships 
Youth

Adult

Climbing European Championships

Number of medals in the Climbing European Youth Cup

Lead

Number of medals in the Climbing World Cup

Lead

Bouldering

Rock climbing

Redpointed routes 
:
 Perfecto Mundo – Margalef (ESP) – November 9, 2019 – Third ascent (first by Alexander Megos)

:
 Neanderthal – Santa Linya (ESP) – December 28, 2018 – Second ascent after Chris Sharma
 El Bon Combat – Cova de I'Ocell (ESP) – December 1, 2018 – Second ascent after Chris Sharma
 Stoking the Fire – Santa Linya (ESP) – January 5, 2018 – Third ascent (first by Chris Sharma, 2013)
 La Planta da Shiva – Villanueva del Rosario (ESP) – January 4, 2016 – Second ascent after Adam Ondra
 Fight or flight – Oliana – December 31, 2014 – Third ascent (first by Chris Sharma, 2011)

 Catxasa – Santa Linya (ESP) – January 9, 2018 – Second ascent after Chris Sharma
 Seleccio Anal – Oliana (ESP) – January 8, 2017 
 Pachamama – Oliana (ESP) – January 2, 2017 – Third ascent (first by Chris Sharma, 2009)
 Joe Mama – Oliana (ESP) – December 27, 2016 – Second ascent after Chris Sharma
 Kangroo Limb – Flatanger (NOR) – May 29, 2016 – Second ascent after Adam Ondra
 Companion of Change – Zillertal (AUT) – November 18, 2015 – First ascent
 Papichulo – Oliana (ESP) – April 27, 2011 – Sixth ascent (first by Chris Sharma, 2008)

:
 Kein Licht Kein Schatten – Ötztal – November 8, 2016 – First ascent
 Kraftplatzl – Berglsteiner See (AUT) – October 15, 2016 – Second Ascent after David Lama
 Direct open your mind – Santa Linya (ESP) – January 3, 2013
 Fuck the System – Santa Linya (ESP)- January 2, 2013
 Analogica Natural – Santa Linya (ESP) – January 2, 2013
 Seleccio Natural – Santa Linya (ESP) – December 28, 2012
 Ciudad de Dios – Santa Linya (ESP) – December 24, 2012
 Martin Krpan – Misja Pec – November 21, 2011
 Hades – Nassereith, Götterwand (AUT) – May 30, 2010 – First ascent by Andreas Bindhammer, 2008
 Underground –  Massone, Arco (ITA) – March 30, 2010 – First ascent by Manfred Stuffer, 1998

Onsighted routes 
:
 Aitzol – Margalef (ESP) – April 23, 2011

Boulder problems 

8C (V15)
Sierra Madre  – Zillertal (AUT) – November 20, 2018 
8B+ (V14)
Witness the fitness – Cova de Ocell (ESP) – January 13, 2019 – flashed 
Hide and Sick – Maltatal (AUT) – March 25, 2018
Off the Wagon - Val Bavona (CHE) January 10, 2020

See also
List of grade milestones in rock climbing
History of rock climbing
Rankings of most career IFSC gold medals

References

External links

 
 
 

Austrian rock climbers
Living people
1990 births
Sportspeople from Innsbruck
Competitors at the 2013 World Games
World Games silver medalists
Competitors at the 2009 World Games
Olympic sport climbers of Austria
Sport climbers at the 2020 Summer Olympics
Medalists at the 2020 Summer Olympics
Olympic bronze medalists for Austria
Olympic medalists in sport climbing
IFSC Climbing World Championships medalists
IFSC Climbing World Cup overall medalists
Boulder climbers